Beinn Ghlas may mean:

Beinn Ghlas (Loch Tay), a mountain in the Southern Highlands of Scotland
Beinn Ghlas (Inveraray), one of the Marilyns in the Southern Highlands
Beinn Ghlas (Oban), one of the Marilyns in the Southern Highlands
Beinn Ghlas (Lochgilphead), one of the Marilyns in the Southern Highlands

See also